The Ministry of Research, Innovation and Science was a government ministry of the Province of Ontario. Founded in 2005, the ministry became part of the Ministry of Economic Development and Innovation in 2011. It intermittently became a separate ministry in again from 2013 until 2018, when it became part of the Ministry of Economic Development, Job Creation and Trade.

History
The research and innovation agenda in Ontario was previously the responsibility of the Science and Technology Division of the Ontario Ministry of Enterprise, Opportunity and Innovation (MEOI).
During the Conservative governments of Harris and Eves, the province organized itself to facilitate partnerships between the public sector and private sector. One such arrangement was a sole-source management agreement between the MEOI Science and Technology Division and the Innovation Institute of Ontario (IIO). The IIO is essentially a private corporation that was contracted to administer the $1.25 billion Ontario Research and Development Challenge Fund.

The Science and Technology Division of MEOI was the subject of a provincial audit in 2003. The Provincial Auditor was particularly critical and in the report said: "A major concern was that the Ministry had committed to spending $4.3 billion without an overall strategic plan to set parameters and consistent policies for existing programs or to guide the development of new programs to meet the objectives of promoting innovation, economic growth, and job creation."
At that time the division had 50 staff, had spent $1.3 billion, and had committed a further $4.8 billion primarily on research grants to universities, colleges, and research hospitals.

Funding
Research funding is also a significant source of funding for higher education. The creation of this new ministry is closely aligned with the 2005 provincial budget, and the "Reaching Higher" initiative to provide $6.2 billion in funding for higher education in 2005-2010.

Funding for research and innovation is also provided by the Canadian Government, and administered through Industry Canada. The Provincial-Federal relationship will be key to the success of  the new Ontario Ministry of Research and Innovation, and may present an opportunity for Premier McGuinty to further the "Strong Ontario" agenda which is attempting to close the $23 billion gap between the tax dollars collected in Ontario by the Federal Government, and the amount the Federal Government returned to the province through federal programs.

Initiatives
The Ontario Ministry of Research and Innovation administered these programs:

Early Researcher Awards
Green Focus on Innovation and Technology (GreenFIT) 
Green Schools Pilot Initiative
Health Technology Exchange
Innovation Demonstration Fund
International Strategic Opportunities Program (ISOP)
Investment Accelerator Fund
Ontario-China Research and Innovation Fund (OCRIF)
Ontario Centres of Excellence
Ontario Emerging Technologies Fund (OETF)
Ontario Innovation Agenda
Ontario Institute for Cancer Research
Ontario's Life Sciences Commercialization Strategy
Ontario Network of Excellence
Ontario Research Fund
Ontario Tax Exemption for Commercialization (OTEC)
Ontario Water Innovation Award
Post-Doctoral Fellowship (PDF) Program
Premier's Innovation Awards

Ministers

Ministers of Research and Innovation
 Reza Moridi 2013–2016
 Glen Murray August 18, 2010 – 2011
 John Milloy June 24, 2009 – August 18, 2010
 John Wilkinson 2007–2009
 Dalton McGuinty 2005–2007

Minister of Research, Innovation and Science
 Reza Moridi 2016—2018

References

External links
Official Site

Research, Innovation and Science